The North Liberties or North Liberties of Limerick is a barony of County Limerick in Ireland, on the north bank of the River Shannon, between the centre of Limerick City to the east and County Clare to the north and west. It comprises parts of 17 townlands in three civil parishes: Killeely, St. Munchin's, and St. Nicholas.

The area of the North Liberties was originally part of Bunratty barony in County Clare. The 1609 royal charter from James I of England for the municipal corporation of Limerick  granted it portions of rural land outside the municipal borough, and erected the whole area into a corporate county, the "county of the city of Limerick", separate from the "county-at-large" of Limerick, and with its own sheriff and grand jury. The rural areas, called the "liberties", were inside the county of the city but outside the borough boundary. There were three parts to the liberties: the  small "North Liberties", the larger "South Liberties" east of the borough on the opposite bank of the River Shannon, and Scattery Island far to the west at the Mouth of the Shannon. In the 1650s, after the Cromwellian conquest of Ireland, the North Liberties were included in the Civil Survey but not the Down Survey, whose supervisor William Petty was himself awarded the lands. The Municipal Corporations (Ireland) Act 1840 detached all the liberties from the county of the city and attached them to the county-at-large. The 1846 Parliamentary Gazetteer and the census through to 1871 regarded the North Liberties as having been annexed to the barony of Pubblebrien, the rest of which was adjacent but south across the Shannon. However, the 1881 census treated the North Liberties as a barony in its own right. A 2008 extension to the boundary of Limerick city encompasses the entire area of the North Liberties.

References

Baronies of County Limerick
Limerick (city)